Aaron Shaw or Shore may refer to:

Aaron Shaw (representative) (1811–1887), U.S. Representative from Illinois
 Aaron Shaw, American bagpipe player in the Wicked Tinkers
Aaron Grady Shaw, actor sometimes credited as Aaron Shaw, in Dirty Laundry (2006 film)
Aaron Shore, fictional character in Designated Survivor (TV series)
Aaron Shaw, fictional character in NCIS (TV series) (Season 17, episode 7)

See also
Aaron Shure, TV writer